Flight 162 may refer to:

Saudia Flight 162, suffered damage on 22/23 December 1980
Asiana Airlines Flight 162, crashed on 14 April 2015

0162